The Volin Town Hall is a historic building in Volin, South Dakota. It was built in 1905 by Larving & Terhosen, and designed in the Vernacular Neoclassical architectural style. Besides being the town hall for Volin, it has also served as "a theater, an opera house, a lecture hall, a basketball court, and a public meeting house." It has been listed on the National Register of Historic Places since April 16, 1980.

References

National Register of Historic Places in Yankton County, South Dakota
Government buildings completed in 1905
City and town halls on the National Register of Historic Places
1905 establishments in South Dakota